J. Mack Slaughter Jr. (born December 28, 1983) is an American television, and film actor, singer and emergency physician.

Career
Born in Fort Worth, Texas, Slaughter began acting in local theatre as a child. At the age of 15, he successfully auditioned for a boy band called Sons of Harmony started by a radio station in Dallas. They toured with Destiny's Child and opened for Bon Jovi and Jessica Simpson. Three years later, in 2001, the band broke up, after which Slaughter moved to Los Angeles to pursue a career in acting. In 2003, he won the role of Keith in the WB sitcom Like Family. The following year, Slaughter had a role in the comedy film Fat Albert, starring Kenan Thompson. In 2008 he founded the non-profit Music Meets Medicine, where musicians volunteer with children and youth at local hospitals, performing and teaching music. In 2018, Music Meets Medicine teamed up with non-profit, Kidd's Kids, to raise $150,000 to create a therapeutic arts space at Dallas Children's Medical Center. Slaughter eventually left acting to attend UT Southwestern Medical School, graduating in 2013 and is currently an emergency room physician at several Texas Health Resources hospitals in the Fort Worth area.

Filmography

References

External links
 

1983 births
Living people
American male film actors
American male television actors
Male actors from Fort Worth, Texas
21st-century American singers
21st-century American male singers